Idris Ibn Idris (born October 19, 1991) is a Mexican basketball who last played for Mineros and the Mexico national basketball team.

He participated at the 2017 FIBA AmeriCup and previously played for UC Riverside.

References

External links
 Idris Dawud Alvarado at RealGM

1991 births
Living people
Mexican men's basketball players
Point guards
UC Riverside Highlanders men's basketball players
Bethany Swedes men's basketball players
Halcones de Ciudad Obregón players
Halcones de Xalapa players
Toros de Nuevo Laredo players
Basketball players from San Diego